Goldsmith & anon v BCD [2011] EWHC 674 was a case in English privacy law in which the Conservative politician Zac Goldsmith sought a superinjunction to prevent the publication of private correspondence after his e-mails were hacked.  The defendant cannot be named due to an anonymity order.

The defendant's mental health is said to be "fragile".

References

External links
Bailii

English privacy case law
2011 in England
2011 in British law
High Court of Justice cases